Laguna salada may refer to:

Places
 Laguna Salada, Valverde, Dominican Republic; a municipality
 Laguna Salada (Mexico), Mexicali, Baja, Mexico; a dry lake in the Sonoran Desert of the Baja Peninsula
 Laguna Salada District, San Bruno, San Mateo, California, USA; a neighborhood in San Bruno, California
 Laguna Salada Fault, a geologic fault on the Mexico-USA border between Mexicali and Imperial counties
 Laguna Salada Marsh, Mori Point Park, Golden Gate National Recreation Area, Pacifica, San Mateo, California, USA; a marsh, see List of lakes in the San Francisco Bay Area
 , Riohacha, Venezuela; a lagoon
 Laguna Salada, Sur Lipez, Bolivia; a lake in the Eduardo Avaroa Andean Fauna National Reserve
 Laguna Salada, Andulusia, Spain; a wetland, see List of Ramsar sites in Spain

Events
  (1820) Venezuelan War of Independence
 1892 Laguna Salada earthquake, a magnitude 7.2 earthquake on the U.S.-Mexico border, in the Salton Trough

Other uses
 Laguna Salada (song), a 1969 song by U.S. rock band James Gang
 Laguna Salada School District, San Mateo, California, USA; the school board of Pacifica, California

See also

 Lagunas saladas de Pétrola y Salobrejo y complejo lagunar de Corral Rubio (ES4210004), Castilla–La Mancha, Spain; a Site of Community Importance; see List of Sites of Community Importance in Castilla–La Mancha
 
 

 Laguna (disambiguation)
 Salada (disambiguation)